Robert Harold Lohr (born November 2, 1960) is an American professional golfer who has played on the PGA Tour and the Nationwide Tour.

Lohr was born in Cincinnati, Ohio and was raised in Milford, Ohio. He attended Miami University in Oxford, Ohio and was a member of the golf team; he won All-American honors (honorable mention) in his senior year, and All-MAC honors in his last three years. He turned pro in 1983 and moved to Loveland, Ohio.

Lohr played on the PGA Tour from 1985 to 1996. He finished in a tie for first place at the end of regulation in three PGA Tour events. In the 1988 Walt Disney World/Oldsmobile Classic, he defeated Chip Beck on the fifth hole of a playoff. In 1993 at the H-E-B Texas Open, he lost in a playoff to Jay Haas. In 1995 at the Bell Canadian Open, Lohr lost in a playoff to Mark O'Meara. He also finished runner-up in four other events.

Lohr's best finish in a major was T-33 in the 1990 U.S. Open.

During his late 30s and 40s, Lohr played some on the Nationwide Tour. He was inducted into the Miami University Athletics Hall of Fame in 1993. He lives in the greater Orlando, Florida area.

Professional wins (3)

PGA Tour wins (1)

PGA Tour playoff record (1–2)

Latin American wins (2)
1987 Peru Open
1990 Mexican Open

Results in major championships

CUT = missed the half-way cut
"T" = tied

See also
1984 PGA Tour Qualifying School graduates

References

External links

American male golfers
Miami RedHawks men's golfers
PGA Tour golfers
Golfers from Ohio
Golfers from Orlando, Florida
Sportspeople from Cincinnati
People from Milford, Ohio
People from Loveland, Ohio
1960 births
Living people